Hypolamprus striatalis is a moth of the family Thyrididae first described by Charles Swinhoe in 1886. It is found in Sri Lanka. and India.

References

Moths of Asia
Moths described in 1885
Thyrididae